William Webbe (died 15 April 1585) was an English politician.

Webbe was Mayor of Salisbury from 1561 to 1562. He was a Member (MP) of the Parliament of England for Salisbury in 1559.

References

Year of birth missing
1585 deaths
English MPs 1559
Mayors of Salisbury